The Edith and Carl Marks Jewish Community House of Bensonhurst (known as the JCH, sometimes called "the J") was incorporated in 1927 and has helped over one million Jews in the Bensonhurst section of New York City's borough of Brooklyn.  It initially served as a community center for Eastern European Jewish immigrants and their children.  As the complexion of the Jewish community in Bensonhurst changed, its community center changed in accord.  During the 1940s and 1950s, a large influx of Syrian Jews immigrated to the area.  It was during this period that Sandy Koufax, the son of Jewish immigrants, played on the basketball courts of the JCH. In the 1980s, a third wave of immigrants, this time from the former Soviet Union, once again shifted the focus of the community center.

Services
The JCH offers social service programs, including Nutrition Outreach and Education Program, financial and mental health counseling, citizenship application aid, Family Violence Prevention Program, Hurricane Assistance Center, and LGBT Refugee Center. For the third wave (from Eastern Europe), much of their work with adults focuses on housing and job search. Many of these beneficiaries came with training, education and valuable skills, but in some cases age and new health issues created new needs for help.

At times they assist in end-of-life situations.

Children 
The community center focuses a lot on children and teens; establishing after school aid programs, tutoring classes, summer camps, Farber-Bruch early childhood center, Zehut teen center, and a Cammarata youth sports center.

Former members

 Harvey Fierstein - Tony Award-winning writer of Torch Song Trilogy, and gay rights activist
 Gary David Goldberg - creator of television series such as Family Ties, Spin City and Brooklyn Bridge
 Sandy Koufax - Baseball Hall of Fame

References

External links
Official site

Jewish Community House of Bensonhurst
Jews and Judaism in New York City
Russian-Jewish culture in New York City
Syrian-American culture in New York City
Syrian-Jewish culture in New York (state)
Jewish organizations established in 1927